Wattle or wattles may refer to:

Plants
Acacia sensu lato,  polyphyletic genus of plants commonly known as wattle, especially in Australia and South Africa
Acacia, large genus of shrubs and trees, native to Australasia
Black wattle, common name for several species of acacia 
Golden wattle, Acacia pycnantha, species of acacia which is the official floral emblem of Australia
Sunshine wattle, Acacia terminalis, species of acacia which grows in southeastern Australia
Callicoma, also known as black wattle, although unrelated to the acacia species

Other uses
Steam Tug Wattle, vessel formerly in commercial service in Victoria Harbour, Melbourne, Australia
Wallace Wattles (1860–1911), American New Thought writer, author
Wattle (anatomy), fleshy growth hanging from the head or neck of certain animals.
Wattle (construction), woven strips of wood forming panels used for fencing or for walling
Wattle and daub, a building technique using woven wooden supports packed with clay or mud
Wattle (dermatology), another term for congenital cartilaginous rest of the neck

See also
Croatian wattle, decorative pattern found in medieval Croatian art
 Waddle (disambiguation)
Wattle bagworm, caterpillar native to Southern Africa
Wattle Day, Australian celebration of the first day of spring
Wattlebird, member of the honeyeater family, native to Australia
Wattle-eye, family of small insect-eating birds native to Africa